Michael Aguilar (born 4 September 1979) is a Belizean hurdler. He competed in the men's 400 metres hurdles at the 2004 Summer Olympics.

References

External links

1979 births
Living people
Athletes (track and field) at the 2004 Summer Olympics
Belizean male hurdlers
Olympic athletes of Belize
Athletes (track and field) at the 2003 Pan American Games
Pan American Games competitors for Belize
Place of birth missing (living people)